John McKnight may refer to:

 John McKnight (English footballer) (fl. 1880s–1890s), English footballer
 John McKnight (Gaelic footballer) (1931–2017), Northern Irish Gaelic footballer
 John McKnight (coach) (fl. 1920s), American football and basketball coach
 John G. McKnight (born 1931), American engineer